This is a list of now defunct airlines from the Solomon Islands.

See also
 List of airlines of Solomon Islands
 List of airports in Solomon Islands

References

Airlines
Solomon Islands